Grace for Grace: The Debates After Augustine and Pelagius (2014) is a volume of conference proceedings from a 2007 conference examining issues related to the semi-Pelagian controversy. There are thirteen essays in the book, which was edited by Alexander Y. Hwang, Brian J. Matz and Augustine Casiday.

References

Further reading

2014 non-fiction books
Conference proceedings published in books
Catholic University of America Press books
2007 conferences
Augustine studies
Pelagianism